Michael John Farrell (born 1902, date of death unknown) was an Irish footballer. He competed in the men's tournament at the 1924 Summer Olympics.

1924 Olympics
Farrell was one of five St James's Gate players selected for the Irish Free State team at the Paris Olympics. Others included Paddy Duncan, Tom Murphy, Charlie Dowdall, and Ernie MacKay. Farrell started Ireland's inaugural game against Bulgaria on 28 May 1924 at the Stade Olympique where his teammate Duncan would score the only goal to secure a historic debut win for the Irish Free State. Farrell himself hit the woodwork during the tie. 

Farrell started Ireland's next match against the Netherlands in the tournament Quarter-Finals at the Stade de Paris on 2 June 1924. Ireland would lose the game 2-1 after Dutch forward Ok Formenoy settled the tie with a strike in the 104th minute of play.

Ireland would end their time in France by playing Estonia in a friendly at the Stade Olympique, winning 3–1. However, Farrell didn't play in this match. His two appearances at the Olympics would be his last for Ireland.

References

1902 births
Year of death missing
Irish association footballers (before 1923)
Olympic footballers of Ireland
Footballers at the 1924 Summer Olympics
St James's Gate F.C. players
Place of birth missing
Association football forwards